Some Boy! is a 1917 American silent comedy-drama film directed by Otis Turner, and starring George Walsh, Doris Pawn, and Herschel Mayall.

A review of the film in the trade publication Exhibitors Herald said, "The story is too slight to hold interest, and the action is slow, with Mr. Walsh ever in the limelight."

Cast
 George Walsh as Joyous Johnson 
 Doris Pawn as Marjorie Milbank 
 Herschel Mayall as William Johnson 
 Caroline Rankin as Arminta Simpkins 
 Hector V. Sarno as Count I. Boccacio 
 Velma Whitman as Dotty Donald 
 Norbert A. Myles as Ned Milbank

References

Bibliography
 Solomon, Aubrey. The Fox Film Corporation, 1915-1935: A History and Filmography. McFarland, 2011.

External links
 

1917 films
1917 comedy-drama films
American silent feature films
American black-and-white films
Films directed by Otis Turner
1910s English-language films
1910s American films
Silent American comedy-drama films